Willows Academy is an all-girls private school in Des Plaines, Illinois, United States, with its religious education under the direction of Opus Dei.  The school is divided into the Middle School (6-8) and High School (9-12). There are approximately 250 students enrolled in grades 6-12, with about 25 students per middle school class and 40 students per high school class. The original school was located on Vernon Avenue in Glencoe, IL. The second location was in Niles, IL.

The school is a member of the Illinois High School Association and the Independent Schools' League. The Academy was named one of the best 50 Catholic secondary schools in the nation in 2008 and is on the 2008 Catholic High School Honor Roll.

Notable people

Alumni
Hannah Ebaneezer Labotka (Class of 2015) appeared on singing reality competition television series The Voice'' (La Voz) in 2019.

History 
The school was founded in 1974 by a group of parents and educators in the Chicago area.

Athletics 
Willows Academy has four sports that compete under IHSA regulations in the Class 2A division. The Willows offers a variety of athletics to girls in all grades.

The Willows is associated with the Independent Schools League (ISL) and competes in inter-league volleyball, cross country, basketball, softball and soccer.

Middle School Athletics: Volleyball, Cross County, Basketball, Soccer

High School Athletics: Volleyball, Cross Country, Basketball, Soccer, Softball

References

External links
 

Des Plaines, Illinois
Educational institutions established in 1974
Private middle schools in Cook County, Illinois
Private high schools in Cook County, Illinois
Opus Dei schools
Girls' schools in Illinois
1974 establishments in Illinois